Dipotassium guanylate is a compound with formula K2(C10H12O4N5PO4). It is a potassium salt of guanylic acid.

As a food additive, it is used as a flavor enhancer and has the E number E628.

References

Nucleotides
Potassium compounds
E-number additives